Shoot First and Pray You Live (Because Luck Has Nothing to Do With It) is a 2008 American Spaghetti Western film written and directed by Lance Doty and based on the novel Luck by Max Brand. Filming took place in Santa Fe, New Mexico.

Premise
Red Pierre was trained to fight and now he shall use those skills to seek revenge on the people who hurt his family.

Cast 
John Doman as Jim Boone
Jim Gaffigan as Mart Ryder
Jeff Hephner as Red Pierre
Tamara Hope as Irene Melody
Richard Tyson as Gandil Morgan
Clay Wilcox as Dick Wilbur
Shannon Zeller as Jack Boone
James Russo as Bob McGurk
Chris Browning as Patterson
Fredrick Lopez as Venalez
Stephen Payne as Mac Hurley
Luce Rains as Phil Branch

Reception
The Indianapolis Business Journal reviewed the movie, stating that "In case you couldn’t tell from the film’s title, this movie is full of bad dialogue and mildly absurd story lines. But if you have ever wondered what kind of movie would arise if you melded “Kill Bill,” “A Fistful of Dollars” and “The Outlaw Josie [sic] Wales,” this movie is for you." The Santa Fe New Mexican also reviewed the film, writing "For a low-budget oater, Shoot First is surprisingly well shot, well acted, and mostly well scripted (though it's a bit talky and repetitious in places)."

Awards
Independent Spirit Award at the Santa Fe Film Festival (2008, won)

References

External links
 

2008 films
2008 Western (genre) films
American Western (genre) films
2000s English-language films
2000s American films